Roland Luçi (born 24 February 1960) is an Albanian footballer. He played in five matches for the Albania national football team from 1981 to 1982.

References

External links
 

1960 births
Living people
Albanian footballers
Albania international footballers
Place of birth missing (living people)
Association footballers not categorized by position